Kojak Variety is a 1995 album by Elvis Costello, composed of cover songs written by others. Rhino Records reissued an expanded, double-CD in 2004 containing a bonus disc.

Background 
Costello said in the liner notes this was a "record of some of my favourite songs performed with some of my favourite musicians." but that he didn't want to record songs that were too familiar. Costello had searched independent record shops: Potter's Music in Richmond, Probe in Liverpool, Rock On in Camden Town, and many American thrift stores and pawn shops to discover albums that he previously had only known from singles or compilations. Costello said he made his best discoveries in what he called "the greatest record collecting store in the world", Village Music in Mill Valley, California.

The first song recorded for the album was "Running Out of Fools", while the last was a new rendering of "Days" by The Kinks, which he had previously recorded for the album soundtrack album Until the End of the World, for the Wim Wenders' film of the same name. The title Kojak Variety refers to the name of a variety store in Barbados near where the album was recorded; Costello was amused by the seemingly random name of the enterprise, and in a similar spirit, decided to apply the name to his album.

Track listing

Tracks 1 and 5 have slightly longer running times and later fade-outs on the 2004 reissue.

Personnel
Elvis Costello – harmonica, vocals
James Burton – acoustic guitar, electric guitar, rhythm guitar
Jim Keltner – drums
Larry Knechtel – piano Hammond organ, electric piano
Marc Ribot – banjo, electric guitar, rhythm guitar, horn, classical guitar
Jerry Scheff – bass
Pete Thomas – drums

Charts
Album

References

External links
 

Elvis Costello albums
1995 albums
Albums produced by Elvis Costello
Rhino Records albums
Warner Records albums
Covers albums